Mount St. Helens National Volcanic Monument is a U.S. National Monument that includes the area around Mount St. Helens in Washington. It was established on August 27, 1982, by U.S. President Ronald Reagan, following the 1980 eruption. The 110,000 acre (445 km2) National Volcanic Monument was set aside for research, recreation, and education. Inside the monument, the environment is left to respond naturally to the disturbance. It was the third national monument to be managed by the U.S. Forest Service.

At dedication ceremonies on May 18, 1983, Max Peterson, head of the USFS, said, "we can take pride in having preserved the unique episode of natural history for future generations." Since then, many trails, viewpoints, information stations, campgrounds, and picnic areas have been established to accommodate the increasing number of visitors each year.

Mountain climbing to the summit of the volcano has been allowed since 1986.

Mount St. Helens Visitor Center at Silver Lake 
Exhibits include the area's culture and history, and the natural history and geology of the volcano and the eruption, including the recovery of the area's vegetation and animal life. The Center includes a theater, a gift shop and outdoor trails. By the end of 1989, the center had hosted more than 1.5 million visitors. A small admission fee is charged.

The center was formerly operated by the U.S. Forest Service.

Johnston Ridge Observatory 

Open daily mid-May through October, exhibits focus on the geologic history of the volcano, eyewitness accounts of the explosion, and the science of monitoring volcanic activity. Two movies and ranger-led programs are available every hour. A half-mile paved trail provides views of the lava dome, crater, pumice plain, and landslide deposit, with access to hiking trails in the restricted area.

The observatory is located near the site of volcanologist David A. Johnston's camp on the morning of May 18, 1980, and was opened in 1997 by President Bill Clinton.

Science and Learning Center at Coldwater 
The Coldwater Ridge Visitor Center in the Coldwater Lake area opened in 1993, operated by the Forest Service, but closed in November 2007 by President George W. Bush due to a lack of funding.

The center reopened as the Science and Learning Center at Coldwater in May 2013, operating as an educational facility and conference center in cooperation with the Mount St. Helens Institute. It was open to the public on weekends from 10am to 6pm. Many of the exhibits have been removed, but the gift shop, theatre, and some signage still exist. It appeared to be closed to the public throughout 2018 and 2019, though it was available for educational residential visits.

The Winds of Change Trail #232, a short, barrier-free interpretive trail, departs from the Science and Learning Center.

South and east sides of Mount St. Helens 

The southern and eastern sides of Mount St. Helens are accessible only by U.S. Forest Service roads. The main roads are:

  U.S. Forest Service Road 25 – Monument entrance from U.S. Route 12 to Road 90.
 U.S. Forest Service Road 26 – Road 99 to Norway Pass to Road 25.
 U.S. Forest Service Road 81 – SR 503/Road 90 to Merrill Lake, Kalama Horse Camp, and Climber's Bivouac.
 U.S. Forest Service Road 83 – Road 90 to Ape Cave, Ape Canyon, Lava Canyon lahar, and Smith Creek.
  U.S. Forest Service Road 90 – Monument entrance from State Route 503.
  U.S. Forest Service Road 99 – Road 25 to Bear Meadows, Meta Lake and Miner's Car, and Windy Ridge.

Bear Meadows 
Bear Meadows is an alpine meadow and viewpoint northeast of Mt. St. Helens. It is located on U.S. Forest Service Road 99. Gary Rosenquist camped here with friends on May 17–18, 1980. He started taking his famous eruption photographs from this location. The sequence of eruption photos provide a time-lapse view of the developing eruption. As the lateral blast developed, he and his friends abandoned their campsite fearing for their lives. He continued taking photos as they escaped in a car. The eruption's lateral blast narrowly missed the site as it was deflected by a ridge just west of the meadow. In an interview with KIRO-TV in 1990, a friend called that ridge "the line of death."

Windy Ridge 

Windy Ridge is the closest view point accessible to the general public. From this vantage point overlooking Spirit Lake, people see not only the evidence of a volcano's destruction, but also the remarkable, gradual (but faster than originally predicted) recovery of the land as revegetation proceeds and wildlife returns.

Ape Cave 

Ape Cave is a lava tube located in Gifford Pinchot National Forest just to the south of Mount St. Helens in Washington state. Its passageway is the longest continuous lava tube in the continental United States and the third longest (in total mapped length) lava tube in North America at 2.5 miles (4,023 meters). Ape Cave is a popular hiking destination with beautiful views of the Mount St. Helens lahar region.  Lava tubes are an unusual formation in this region, as volcanoes of the Cascade Range are mostly stratovolcanos and do not typically erupt with pahoehoe (fluid basalt).  

The cave was discovered circa 1951 by Lawrence Johnson, a logger, when he noticed a tree that "looked wrong." After investigating the tree, he discovered it tilted into a lava tube collapse. A few days later, Johnson brought the Reese family back to the cave, and Harry Reese was lowered to the floor and became the first person to explore the interior. Subsequent explorations were conducted by members of the Mount St. Helens Apes, a local Boy Scout troop.

Ape Cave Trail No. 239, which runs along the interior of the cave, is a National Recreation Trail receiving 170,000 visitors each year.

See also
 List of national monuments of the United States

References

External links 

 Mount St. Helens National Volcanic Monument – official U.S. Forest Service site
 Mount St. Helens Visitor Center at Silver Lake – official Washington State Parks site
 Mount St. Helens National Volcanic Monument – Visit a Volcano, includes maps and volcano information
 Travel information about Mount St. Helens National Volcanic Monument
 Johnston Ridge Observatory

National Monuments in Washington (state)
Mount St. Helens
Gifford Pinchot National Forest
Museums in Cowlitz County, Washington
Natural history museums in Washington (state)
Protected areas of Cowlitz County, Washington
Protected areas of Lewis County, Washington
Protected areas of Skamania County, Washington
Protected areas established in 1982
1982 establishments in Washington (state)
United States Forest Service National Monuments